Czechoslovakia competed at the 1992 Summer Paralympics in Barcelona, Spain. 29 competitors from Czechoslovakia won 13 medals, including 4 gold, 3 silver and 6 bronze and finished 26th in the medal table.

See also 
 Czechoslovakia at the Paralympics
 Czechoslovakia at the 1992 Summer Olympics

References 

Nations at the 1992 Summer Paralympics
1992
Summer Paralympics